2000 Amateur championship of Ukraine was the ninth amateur championship of Ukraine and the 37th since the establishment of championship among fitness clubs (KFK) in 1964.

There was introduced one more stage.

Teams

Location map

First stage

Group 1

Group 2

Group 3

Group 4

Group 5

Group 6

Group 7

Group 8

Second stage

Group 9

Group 10

Group 11

Group 12

Final stage
The second stage was finals that took place in Nizhyn and Varva, Chernihiv Oblast on September 12–17, 2000.

Group A

Group B

External links
 Information on the competition

Ukrainian Football Amateur League seasons
Amateur
Amateur